Steven J. Santarsiero is a Democratic member of the Pennsylvania State Senate and former member of the Pennsylvania House of Representatives. He represented the 31st District between 2009 and 2017. Most recently, he served as Chief Deputy Attorney General of Pennsylvania for Environmental Protection from May 2017 to January 2018

Background
Santarsiero received his bachelor's degree from Tufts University in 1987.  He went on to earn a J.D. from the University of Pennsylvania Law School in 1992. He practiced as an attorney in Newark. He has also worked as a school teacher, receiving his M.Ed. from Holy Family University. He taught social studies at Bensalem High School.

Political career
Santarsiero was elected to the Lower Makefield Board of Supervisors in 2003. He organized the Southeastern Bucks League of Municipalities, a discussion forum for 19 townships and boroughs in lower Bucks County.

In 2008, Santarsiero was elected to Pennsylvania's House of Representatives with 53% of the vote, defeating Republican challenger Pete Stainthorpe. Santarsiero defeated Republican challenger Rob Ciervo by 162 votes in 2010, securing his second term in office. In 2012, Santarsiero was elected with 58% of the vote, defeating Republican Anne Chapman.

Santarsiero served on the Children & Youth, Education, Environmental Resources & Energy, and Transportation Committees.

On May 4, 2017, Pennsylvania Attorney General Josh Shapiro appointed Santarsiero as the first Chief Deputy Attorney General for Environmental Protection. He resigned his position in January 2018 in order to launch a bid for Pennsylvania Senate, District 10, the seat held by retiring Senator Chuck McIlhinney.

2016 congressional election

Santarsiero announced his candidacy for Pennsylvania's 8th congressional district on January 8, 2015. He won the Democratic primary in April 2016 and faced Republican Brian Fitzpatrick in the general election. Santarsiero lost to Fitzpatrick in the general election 54%-46%.

2018 State Senate election

Santarsiero announced his candidacy for State Senate in Pennsylvania's 10th Senatorial District on January 27, 2018. The incumbent, Republican Chuck McIlhinney, did not seek reelection. Santarsiero defeated State Representative Marguerite Quinn in the November 6th, 2018 general election to win the seat.

Political positions

LGBT issues
Santarsiero supports same-sex marriage.

Gun policy
In early 2013, Santarsiero introduced a bill which would end the permitting of intrastate long gun purchases in Pennsylvania. The bill, which has never been brought to a vote, was the subject of controversy in Pennsylvania, drawing support from Cease Fire PA, Bucks Safe, the Peace Center, Keystone Progress, and Mayors Against Illegal Guns and opposition from the Second Amendment Action Group and the National Rifle Association. In 2016, PolitiFact.com found Santarsiero's claim that he "wrote Pennsylvania's Gun Safety Law" to be false.

Environment
Santarsiero has called for increased regulation of Marcellus Shale, natural gas, and hydraulic fracturing. In 2012, he introduced H.B. 2414, which would increase regulation of natural gas drilling. HB 2414 was a part of a six-piece legislative package known as the Marcellus Compact, sponsored by Pennsylvania Democrats to regulate the natural gas industry in the state. The legislation did not come to a vote.

Legislative reform
Santarsiero voted to reduce the Pennsylvania State Legislature by 65 seats.

Campaign finance reform
Following the Citizens United Supreme Court Ruling, Santarsiero introduced a bill calling for a convention to amend the United States Constitution to allow states and the United States Congress to pass laws limiting the amount of money that any person or group can donate to federal or state elections. He has since reintroduced this resolution twice.

Controversy

On April 19, 2019, Bucks County Courier Times reported that Senator Steve Santarsiero had been accused of serious ethical misconduct while a partner in the law firm Curtin & Heefner by opposing legal counsel from the law firm Fox & Rothschild LLP. The ethics violation accusation arose from a conflict of interest over the Rockhill Quarry in East Rockhill, PA when it was uncovered that Santarsiero and his law firm were representing the Rockhill Environmental Preservation Alliance that opposed the quarry. Fox Rothschild's lawyer alleged Santarsiero used information gained through the privilege of public office to monetarily benefit himself, a family member, or an associated business. Santarsiero officially resigned a month later from Curtain & Heefner as a result of the alleged ethics violation.

On November 1, 2021, Bucks County Courier Times reported that Steve Santarsiero helped organize and spoke at a politically-charged "Peace Vigil" held at the Garden Of Reflection Memorial Park in Lower Makefield, PA. The protest was sparked by the filing of a federal First Amendment lawsuit against Pennsbury School District and Santarsiero's law firm Rudolph Clarke for ongoing censorship of community members at school board meeting public comment sessions. The plaintiffs in the case prevailed, legal docket case name Marshall v Amuso, leading to an injunction which ruled that Pennsylvania School Board Association's Policy 903 template was illegal and a settlement requiring Pennsbury School District to pay $300,000 to the plaintiffs and their legal counsel.

References

External links
 U.S. Congress campaign website
Pennsylvania House of Representatives biography
Pennsylvania House Democratic Caucus - Steve Santarsiero 

Living people
Tufts University alumni
University of Pennsylvania Law School alumni
Democratic Party Pennsylvania state senators
Democratic Party members of the Pennsylvania House of Representatives
21st-century American politicians
Candidates in the 2016 United States elections
1965 births
20th-century lawyers
20th-century educators
Politicians from Bucks County, Pennsylvania